E. T. Mohammed Basheer (born 1 July 1946) is an Indian politician and social worker who serves as the Member of Parliament from Ponnani Parliament Constituency of the Indian state Kerala.

Basheer was first elected to Kerala Legislative Assembly in 1985. He served as the Kerala state Education Minister (1991–96 and 2001–06) under K. Karunakaran, A. K. Antony and Oommen Chandy. He has been a member of Parliament from 2009 (three terms, 2009, 2014 and 2019).  

Basheer is the National Organising Secretary and Kerala State Party Secretary of Indian Union Muslim League. He also leads the League in Lok Sabha (the Lower House).

Life and career
Baheer was born on 1 July 1946 to E. T. Moosakutty and Fathima at Mapram, Vazhakkad, in present-day Malappuram District. He entered politics through Muslim Students Federation (M. S. F.), the student wing of Indian Union Muslim League.

He later served as the Kondotty Mandalam Committee President, Malappuram District Committee Secretary and State Secretariat Member of Indian Union Muslim League.

He is married to Rukhiya Basheer.

Political career
Basheer actively engaged in trade union field and became Kerala State Secretary of Swatantra Thozhilali Union (S. T. U). He also worked as president of various trade unions affiliated to S. T. U. in industrial firms like:

 Mavoor Gwalior Rayons
 Malabar Cements, Palakkad, Edarikode Textiles
 Kerala Electrical and Allied, Kundara
 Malabar Spinning Mills, Kozhikode
 Modern Spinning Mills, Kozhikode
 Steel Complex, Kozhikode
 K. S. D. C. Kuttipuram 

He was also Member in Kerala Agricultural University Senate, Kerala State Orphanage Control Board and Industries Relationship Committee.

As Minister for Education  (1991–96 and 2001–06) 
As Minister for Education, Basheer was instrumental in promoting the concept of Self-financing Colleges. 

 Introduction of Grading System at the Secondary and Higher Secondary Levels.

 Establishment of Kannur University, Sanskrit University, Kaladi & National University of Advanced Legal Studies at Kochi.
 Expansion of information technology enabled education and the inclusion of  information technology as a part of curriculum in Secondary Level.
 Implemented special package for the education and social upliftment of the physically and mentally handicapped children.

Committee Membership 

 Central Advisory Board of Education (C. A. B. E.)
 Government of India Committee on Decentralisation of Education Management
 Janardhana Reddy Commission on National Educational Policy
 Minority Education Monitoring Committee

Member of Legislative Assembly

Minister in different Kerala ministries

Member of Parliament

References

External links 
 Official Website (MP Office Ponnani)
 Loksabha MP Biodata
 Indian Union Muslim League
 Kerala Assembly

Living people
1946 births
India MPs 2009–2014
Indian Union Muslim League politicians
Lok Sabha members from Kerala
India MPs 2014–2019
People from Malappuram district
Kerala MLAs 1982–1987
Kerala MLAs 1996–2001
Education Ministers of Kerala
India MPs 2019–present